Strube is a surname. Notable people with the surname include:

Cordelia Strube, Canadian playwright and novelist
Gustav Strube (1867–1953), German conductor and composer
Henrik Strube (born 1949), Danish musician
Jürgen F. Strube (born 1939), German businessman
Sidney Strube (1891–1956), British cartoonist